Abraham Enschedé (20 March 1760 – 2 August 1820) was a Dutch newspaper editor and printer.

Biography
Enschedé was born and died in Haarlem. He was a son of Johannes Enschedé and Helena Hoefnagel. For some time he was a partner in the family company. On 31 October 1785 in Weesp he married Sandrina Christina Swaving (Rio de Berbice 25 December 1768–Haarlem 28 June 1822) the daughter of Jan Justus Swaving and Christina Elisabeth Becker. On 16 March 1787 in Haarlem his son Jacobus Enschedé II was born.

References

 Het huis Enschedé 1703–1953, Joh. Enschedé en Zonen, Haarlem 1953
 Enschede aan het Klokhuisplein, (Dutch), by Just Enschede, De Vrieseborch, Haarlem, 1991, 
 Catalogue de la bibliothèque (manuscrits, ouvrages xylographiques, incunables, ouvrages d'estampes, livres curieux et rares) formée pendant le 18e siècle par Messieurs Izaak, Iohannes et le Dr. Iohannes Enschedé, sale catalog for the auction of Enschedé III's collection by Frederik Muller and Martinus Nijhoff, 9 December 1867; version on Google books

1760 births
1820 deaths
People from Haarlem
Dutch businesspeople
Dutch art collectors
Bibliophiles
Dutch printers
Dutch newspaper editors